The Palemonids were a legendary dynasty of Grand Dukes of the Grand Duchy of Lithuania. The legend was born in the 15th or 16th century as proof that Lithuanians and the Grand Duchy are of Roman origins. Already Jan Długosz (1415–1480) wrote that the Lithuanians were of Roman origin, but did not provide any proof. The legend is first recorded in the second edition of the Lithuanian Chronicle produced in the 1530s. At the time the Grand Duchy of Lithuania was quarrelling with the Kingdom of Poland, rejecting the claims that Poland had civilized the pagan and barbaric Lithuania. The Lithuanian nobility felt a need for the ruling dynasty to show upstanding origins, as the only available chronicles at the time were written by the Teutonic Knights, a long-standing enemy, and depicted Gediminas, ancestor of the Gediminids dynasty, as a hostler of Vytenis.

In this new Lithuanian chronicle, Palemon (could be Polemon II of Pontus), a relative of Roman Emperor Nero, escaped Rome together with 500 noble families. The company traveled north, through the Baltic Sea, and reached the Nemunas Delta. After that they decided to sail upstream until they reached the mouth of Dubysa. There, the Palemonids settled on a large hill and ruled the country for generations until the Gediminids emerged. The chronicle skipped Mindaugas and Traidenis, attested Grand Dukes of Lithuania, entirely. It incorporated the account of the Gediminid line from the first edition. To make the story more believable, the chronicler presented a very detailed account of the journey. Because there were not enough generations to cover the gap between the 1st century when Palemon arrived and the 14th century when Gediminas died, the third edition of the chronicle, also known as the Bychowiec Chronicle, placed Palemon in the 5th century instead of the 1st, when Rome was devastated by Attila the Hun, and included Mindaugas and other attested dukes. But it was not enough and historians like Maciej Stryjkowski and Kazimierz Kojałowicz-Wijuk moved the account further, into the 10th century. Multiple contradictory versions of the legend survive to this day as historians tried to patch up some obvious mistakes and make it more historically sound.

The first to critically evaluate and reject the legend was historian Joachim Lelewel in 1839. At the end of the 19th century there were some attempts, for example in a history written by Maironis, to tie the legend with the expansion of the vikings. While many historians up until the dawn of the 20th century believed the legend to be true, it is now largely discarded as a fictional story that only serves to illustrate political ideology in the 16th-century Lithuania. 

A neighborhood in Kaunas is named after Palemonids – 
.

Genealogical tree according to the second edition of the Lithuanian Chronicles

See also 
Family of Gediminas
Gediminids

References

Italian noble families
Lithuanian noble families
Legendary monarchs